These are the results for the 29th edition of the Ronde van Nederland cycling race, which was held from August 14 to August 19, 1989. The race started in Nieuwegein (Utrecht) and finished 857 kilometres later in Gulpen (Limburg).

Stages

14-08-1989: Nieuwegein-Nieuwegein (Prologue), 5 km

15-08-1989: Nieuwegein-Dordrecht, 167 km

16-08-1989: Dordrecht-Huizen, 92 km

16-08-1989: Hilversum-Huizen (Time Trial), 15 km

17-08-1989: Huizen-Raalte, 204 km

18-08-1989: Raalte-Eindhoven, 196 km

19-08-1989: Geleen-Gulpen, 178 km

Final classification

External links
Wielersite Results

Ronde van Nederland
August 1989 sports events in Europe
1989 in road cycling
Ronde